The 2008 Pacific hurricane season officially started on May 15 in the East Pacific Ocean, and on June 1 in the Central Pacific; they both ended on November 30. These dates conventionally delimit the period of each year when most tropical cyclones form in the Pacific basin. The first storm of the year, Tropical Storm Alma, developed on May 29, and the last, Tropical Storm Polo dissipated on November 5.[

This timeline documents all the storm formations, strengthening, weakening, landfalls, extratropical transitions, as well as dissipation. For convenience and clarity, in the timeline below, all landfalls are bolded. The timeline will also include information, when it becomes available, which was not operationally released, meaning that information from post-storm reviews by the National Hurricane Center, such as information on a storm that was not operationally warned on, have been included.

The graphical bar below gives a brief overview of storm activity during the season, and for convenience, the storm's maximum intensity is included as a color bar.

Timeline

May
May 15
 The 2008 Eastern Pacific hurricane season officially begins.
May 29

 0000 UTC (5:00 p.m.
 0600 UTC (11:00 p.m. May 28) – Tropical Depression One-E strengthens into Tropical Storm Alma.
 1945 UTC (12:45 p.m.) – Tropical Storm Alma makes landfall near Leon, Nicaragua.
May 30
 0600 UTC (11:00 p.m. May 29) – Tropical Storm Alma weakens into a tropical depression.
 1800 UTC (11:00 p.m.) – Tropical Depression Alma dissipates.

June
June 1
 The Central Pacific hurricane season officially begins.
June 27
 0600 UTC (11:00 p.m.
 1200 UTC (5:00 a.m. PDT) – Tropical Depression Two-E strengthens into Tropical Storm Boris.
 1800 UTC (11:00 a.m.
June 28
 1200 UTC (5:00 a.m. PDT) – Tropical Depression Three-E strengthens into Tropical Storm Cristina.
June 29

 0000 UTC (5:00 p.m.
July 30
 1200 UTC (5:00 a.m. PDT) – Tropical Storm Cristina weakens into a tropical depression.
 1800 UTC (11:00 a.m. PDT) – Tropical Depression Cristina weakens into a remnant low.

July
July 1
 0000 UTC (5:00 p.m. PDT June 30) – Tropical Storm Boris strengthens into a Category 1 hurricane.
 1800 UTC (11:00 a.m. PDT) – Hurricane Boris weakens back to a tropical storm.
 1800 UTC (11:00 a.m.
July 2
 0000 UTC (5:00 p.m. PDT July 1) – Tropical Storm Boris reintensifies into a Category 1 hurricane.
 0600 UTC (11:00 p.m.
 1800 UTC (11:00 a.m. PDT) – Hurricane Boris weakens back to a tropical storm.
 1800 UTC (11:00 a.m. PDT) – Tropical Depression Four-E strengthens into Tropical Storm Douglas.
July 3
 1800 UTC (11:00 a.m. PDT) – Tropical Storm Douglas weakens into a tropical depression.
July 4
 0000 UTC (5:00 p.m. PDT July 3) – Tropical Storm Boris weakens into a tropical depression.
 0600 UTC (11:00 p.m. PDT July 3) – Tropical Depression Douglas weakens into a remnant low.
 1200 UTC (5:00 a.m. PDT) – Tropical Depression Boris weakens into a remnant low.
July 5
 1800 UTC (11:00 a.m.
July 6
 1200 UTC (5:00 a.m.
July 7
 1200 UTC (5:00 a.m. PDT) – Tropical Depression Five-E dissipates.
July 11
 1800 UTC (11:00 a.m.
July 12
 0600 UTC (11:00 p.m. PDT July 11) – Tropical Depression Six-E strengthens into Tropical Storm Elida.
July 14
 1200 UTC (5:00 a.m. PDT) – Tropical Storm Elida strengthens into a Category 1 hurricane.
July 16

 0600 UTC (11:00 p.m.
 1200 UTC (5:00 a.m. PDT) – Tropical Depression Seven-E strengthens into Tropical Storm Fausto.
 1800 UTC (11:00 a.m. PDT) – Hurricane Elida strengthens into a Category 2 hurricane.
July 17
 1200 UTC (5:00 a.m. PDT) – Hurricane Elida weakens into a Category 1 hurricane.
July 18
 0600 UTC (11:00 p.m. PDT July 17) – Hurricane Elida weakens into a tropical storm.
 1200 UTC (5:00 a.m. PDT) – Tropical Storm Fausto strengthens into a Category 1 hurricane.
July 19
 0600 UTC (11:00 p.m. PDT July 18) – Tropical Storm Elida weakens into a tropical depression.
 1200 UTC (5:00 a.m. PDT) – Tropical Depression Elida weakens into a remnant low.
July 20
 1200 UTC (5:00 a.m.
July 21
 1200 UTC (5:00 a.m.
 1800 UTC (11:00 a.m. PDT) – Hurricane Fausto weakens into a tropical storm.
 1800 UTC (11:00 a.m. PDT) – Tropical Depression Eight-E strengthens into Tropical Storm Genevieve.
July 22

 1800 UTC (11:00 a.m. PDT) – Tropical Storm Fausto weakens into a tropical depression.
July 23
 0000 UTC (5:00 p.m. PDT July 22) – Tropical Depression Fausto weakens into a remnant low.
July 25
 1200 UTC (5:00 a.m. PDT) – Tropical Storm Genevieve strengthens into a Category 1 hurricane.
July 26
 0600 UTC (11:00 p.m. PDT July 25) – Hurricane Genevieve weakens into a tropical storm.
July 27
 0600 UTC (11:00 p.m. PDT July 26) – Tropical Storm Genevieve weakens into a tropical depression.
 1200 UTC (5:00 a.m. PDT) – Tropical Depression Genevieve weakens into a remnant low.

August
August 6
 1200 UTC (5:00 a.m.
August 7

 0000 UTC (5:00 p.m. PDT August 6) – Tropical Depression Nine-E strengthens into Tropical Storm Hernan.
 0000 UTC (2:00 p.m.
 0600 UTC (8:00 p.m. HST August 6) – Tropical Depression One-C strengthens into Tropical Storm Kika.
 1800 UTC (8:00 a.m.
August 8
 1200 UTC (5:00 a.m. PDT) – Tropical Storm Hernan strengthens into a Category 1 hurricane.
 1800 UTC (8:00 a.m. PDT) – Tropical Storm Kika weakens into a tropical depression.
August 9
 0600 UTC (11:00 p.m. PDT August 8) – Hurricane Hernan strengthens into a Category 2 hurricane.
 0600 UTC (8:00 p.m. HST August 8) – Tropical Depression Kika restrengthens into a tropical storm.
 1200 UTC (5:00 a.m. PDT) – Hurricane Hernan strengthens into a Category 3 major hurricane.
August 10
 0600 UTC (11:00 p.m. PDT August 9) – Hurricane Hernan weakens into a Category 2 hurricane.
 1200 UTC (5:00 a.m. PDT) – Hurricane Hernan weakens into a Category 1 hurricane.
August 11
 0000 UTC (2:00 p.m. HST August 10) – Tropical Storm Kika weakens back into a tropical depression.
August 12
 0000 UTC (5:00 p.m. PDT August 11) – Hurricane Hernan weakens into a tropical storm.
 1200 UTC (2:00 a.m. HST) – Tropical Depression Kika weakens into a tropical disturbance.
August 13
 0000 UTC (5:00 p.m. PDT August 12) – Tropical Storm Hernan weakens into a remnant low.
 1200 UTC (5:00 a.m.
 1800 UTC (11:00 a.m. PDT) – Tropical Depression Ten-E strengthens into Tropical Storm Iselle.
August 14
 0600 UTC (8:00 p.m. PDT August 13) – Tropical Disturbance Kika moves west of the International Date Line.
 1200 UTC (5:00 a.m.
August 16
 0000 UTC (5:00 p.m. PDT August 15) – Tropical Storm Iselle weakens into a tropical depression.
August 17
 0000 UTC (5:00 p.m. PDT August 16) – Tropical Depression Iselle weakens into a remnant low.
August 23
 1200 UTC (5:00 a.m.
 1800 UTC (11:00 a.m. PDT) – Tropical Depression Eleven-E strengthens into Tropical Storm Julio.
August 24

 1800 UTC (11:00 a.m.
August 25
 0000 UTC (5:00 p.m.
August 26
 0000 UTC (5:00 p.m. PDT August 25) – Tropical Storm Julio weakens into a tropical depression.
 1800 UTC (11:00 a.m. PDT) – Tropical Depression Julio weakens into a remnant low.

September
September 2
 0600 UTC (11:00 p.m.
 1200 UTC (5:00 a.m. PDT) – Tropical Depression Twelve-E strengthens into Tropical Storm Karina.
September 3
 0000 UTC (5:00 p.m. PDT September 2) – Tropical Storm Karina weakens into a tropical depression.
 1800 UTC (11:00 a.m. PDT) – Tropical Depression Karina weakens into a remnant low.
September 6
 1200 UTC (5:00 a.m.
September 7
 0000 UTC (5:00 p.m. PDT September 6) – Tropical Depression Thirteen-E strengthens into Tropical Storm Lowell.
 1200 UTC (5:00 a.m.
September 10
 0600 UTC (11:00 p.m. PDT September 9) – Tropical Storm Lowell weakens into a tropical depression.
September 11
 0900 UTC (2:00 a.m. PDT) – Tropical Depression Lowell makes landfall near Cabo San Lucas, Mexico with winds of 
 1800 UTC (11:00 a.m. PDT) – Tropical Depression Lowell dissipates.

October
October 1

 0600 UTC (11:00 p.m.
 1200 UTC (5:00 a.m. PDT) – Tropical Depression Fourteen-E strengthens into Tropical Storm Marie.
October 3
 1800 UTC (11:00 a.m. PDT) – Tropical Storm Marie strengthens into a Category 1 hurricane.
October 4
 0000 UTC (5:00 p.m.
 0000 UTC (5:00 p.m.
 1800 UTC (11:00 a.m. PDT) – Hurricane Marie weakens into a tropical storm.
October 5
 0000 UTC (5:00 p.m. PDT October 4) – Tropical Depression Fifteen-E strengthens into Tropical Storm Norbert.
October 6
 1200 UTC (5:00 a.m. PDT) – Tropical Storm Marie weakens into a tropical depression.
October 7

 0000 UTC (5:00 p.m. PDT October 6) – Tropical Depression Marie weakens into a remnant low.
 0600 UTC (11:00 p.m. PDT October 6) – Tropical Storm Norbert strengthens into a Category 1 hurricane.
October 8
 0000 UTC (5:00 p.m. PDT October 7) – Hurricane Norbert strengthens into a Category 2 hurricane.
 0600 UTC (11:00 p.m. PDT October 7) – Hurricane Norbert strengthens into a Category 3 major hurricane.
 1200 UTC (5:00 a.m.
 1800 UTC (11:00 a.m. PDT) – Hurricane Norbert strengthens into a Category 4 major hurricane.
October 9
 0000 UTC (5:00 p.m. PDT October 8) – Hurricane Norbert weakens into a Category 3 major hurricane.
 0600 UTC (11:00 p.m. PDT October 8) – Tropical Depression Sixteen-E strengthens into Tropical Storm Odile.
 1200 UTC (5:00 a.m. PDT) – Hurricane Norbert weakens into a Category 2 hurricane.
 1800 UTC (11:00 a.m. PDT) – Hurricane Norbert weakens into a Category 1 hurricane.
October 11
 0000 UTC (5:00 p.m. PDT October 10) – Hurricane Norbert restrengthens into a Category 2 hurricane.
 0600 UTC (11:00 a.m. PDT October 10) – Hurricane Norbert restrengthens into a Category 3 major hurricane.
 0600 UTC (11:00 a.m.
 1200 UTC (5:00 a.m. PDT) – Hurricane Norbert weakens back into a Category 2 hurricane.
 1630 UTC (9:30 a.m.
October 12
 0000 UTC (5:00 p.m. PDT October 11) – Hurricane Norbert weakens back into a Category 1 hurricane.
 0400 UTC (9:00 p.m.
 0600 UTC (11:00 p.m. PDT October 11) – Tropical Storm Odile weakens into a tropical depression.
 0700 UTC (12:00 a.m. PDT) – Hurricane Norbert weakens into a tropical storm.
 1200 UTC (5:00 a.m. PDT) – Tropical Storm Norbert weakens into a tropical depression.
 1800 UTC (11:00 a.m. PDT) – Tropical Depression Norbert dissipates.
October 13
 0000 UTC (5:00 p.m. PDT) – Tropical Depression Odile weakens into a remnant low.
October 23
 0600 UTC (11:00 p.m.
October 24
 1800 UTC (11:00 a.m. PDT) – Tropical Depression Seventeen-E weakens into a remnant low.

November
November 2

 1200 UTC (5:00 a.m.
November 3
 0000 UTC (5:00 p.m. PDT November 2) – Tropical Depression Eighteen-E strengthens into Tropical Storm Polo.
 0600 UTC (11:00 p.m.
November 5
 0000 UTC (5:00 p.m. PDT November 4) – Tropical Storm Polo weakens into a tropical depression.
 0600 UTC (11:00 p.m. PDT November 4) – Tropical Depression Polo dissipates.
November 30
 The 2008 Central and Eastern Pacific hurricane seasons end.

References

See also

Timeline of the 2008 Atlantic hurricane season
Timeline of the 2008 Pacific typhoon season
Timeline of the 2008 North Indian Ocean cyclone season
South-West Indian Ocean cyclone seasons: 2007–08, 2008–09
Australian region cyclone seasons: 2007–08, 2008–09
South Pacific cyclone seasons:2007–08, 2008–09

Pacific hurricane meteorological timelines